Feudal Lords is a closed-end, computer moderated, play-by-mail game set in medieval England. Starting as a game run through a magazine in 1977, it was first published by Graaf Simulations, later run by Flying Buffalo, Inc, and is today published by Rick Loomis PBM Games.

History and development
John Van De Graaf created Feudal Lords in 1977 with basic gameplay, set in King Arthur times. Van de Graaf published the game in his Diplomacy magazine, updating the rules and integrating a computer in 1980. In 1982, following a playtest, he published the game through a new company, Graaf Simulations. The design comprised economic, military and diplomatic aspects.

Bill Paxton won Game #1, which ended in 1982. Flying Buffalo also ran the game. The copyright date on Flying Buffalo's rules written by John Van De Graaf is 1982. In 1984, Graaf Simulations had over 35 games running. As of October 2021, Rick Loomis PBM Games publishes the game. The game is computer-moderated.

Gameplay
The game is set in medieval England after the death of King Arthur. Each player controls one of the 46 fiefs on the map of England, with non-played feifs acting independently. Players have 32 possible orders available, but can only submit 12 per one-year turn. Other limits apply, such as one military campaign annually. According to reviewer Chris Frink, these constraints "make for a better-balanced, more interesting game". Players must manage various aspects of medieval life, including maintaining knights, peasants, and townspeople, and accounting for economic factors such as mining and agriculture. Diplomacy is critical to success; winning is not possible without alliances. 

The object of the game is to gain control of 23 of the 46 feifs.

Reviews
 Dragon, No. 72

See also
 List of play-by-mail games

References

Bibliography

Further reading
 
 
 
 
 
 
 
 
 

Flying Buffalo games
Multiplayer games
Play-by-mail games